The Pearson Cabin, also known as Toklat Ranger Station No. 4, is a log shelter in the National Park Service Rustic style in Denali National Park in Alaska. It was listed on the National Register of Historic Places in 1986. It is a standard design by the National Park Service Branch of Plans and Designs and was built in  1927.

It is significant as the oldest patrol cabin in Denali park that was built entirely by park rangers, and is likely the only surviving one.

References

Ranger stations in Denali National Park and Preserve
Buildings and structures in Denali Borough, Alaska
Park buildings and structures on the National Register of Historic Places in Alaska
Log cabins in the United States
Rustic architecture in Alaska
Buildings and structures on the National Register of Historic Places in Denali Borough, Alaska
Log buildings and structures on the National Register of Historic Places in Alaska
1927 establishments in Alaska
National Register of Historic Places in Denali National Park and Preserve